Placodiscus bracteosus is a species of plant in the family Sapindaceae. It is found in Ivory Coast and Ghana. It is threatened by habitat loss.

References

bracteosus
Vulnerable plants
Taxonomy articles created by Polbot